George Kirby (20 December 1933 – 24 March 2000) was an English footballer and manager.

Playing career

Kirby was born in Liverpool. He was a centre forward who played for Everton, Sheffield Wednesday, Plymouth Argyle, Southampton, Walsall, Swansea City, Coventry City, New York Generals and Brentford. His career lasted from 1952 to 1969 during which he made 309 Football League appearances and scored 119 goals.

Management career
His first post in management was at Halifax Town, initially as coach to Alan Ball Senior and then in 1970 as first team manager. He spent only one full season in charge, giving the club their most successful ever campaign just missing out on promotion to the old second division. He started the 1971–72 season by leading Halifax to a 2–1 Watney Cup victory over a full strength Manchester United side, which included George Best, Denis Law and Bobby Charlton. Just a week later Kirby left Halifax to take charge at Watford where he remained until May 1973. At Watford, injuries, boardroom unrest, and a shortage of luck and money, conspired to produce two terrible winters consisting of one humiliation and very nearly a second.

He later moved to Iceland where he managed one of the country's leading clubs; Íþróttabandalag Akraness (ÍA)

In 1978, he left Akranes and returned to Halifax. Kirby inspired the team to another famous victory over Mancunian rivals; this time it was the turn of Malcolm Allison's Manchester City, who fell to a single Paul Hendrie goal in an FA Cup 3rd round tie in January 1980. His second spell with the Yorkshire club ended in June 1981 after a string of poor results saw his team finish second bottom of the old 4th division.

References

The Watford Football Club Illustrated Who's Who by Trefor Jones

1933 births
2000 deaths
Footballers from Liverpool
English footballers
Association football forwards
Everton F.C. players
Sheffield Wednesday F.C. players
Plymouth Argyle F.C. players
Southampton F.C. players
Coventry City F.C. players
Swansea City A.F.C. players
Walsall F.C. players
New York Generals (NPSL) players
New York Generals players
Brentford F.C. players
Worcester City F.C. players
English Football League players
National Professional Soccer League (1967) players
North American Soccer League (1968–1984) players
English football managers
Halifax Town A.F.C. managers
Watford F.C. managers
Íþróttabandalag Akraness managers
English Football League managers
English expatriates in Iceland
English expatriate sportspeople in the United States
Expatriate soccer players in the United States
English expatriate footballers